Vilnius Palace of Concerts and Sports is an indoor arena in Vilnius, Lithuania. The venue was opened in 1971. It was deemed unsafe and closed in 2004. Plans to reconstruct the venue received significant opposition from the Jewish community as the site is located on the grounds of the oldest Jewish cemetery in Vilnius.

The arena was capable of holding 4,400 spectators. It was primarily used for volleyball and basketball. In October 1988, the arena was the site of the Inaugural Congress of Sąjūdis, the Reform movement which led Lithuania in achieving independence from the Soviet Union. It was also the site of the public funeral of 13 Lithuanians killed by Soviet troops at the Vilnius Television Tower during the January Events of 1991.

The arena is emblematic of Communist Modernism. It is one of the few remaining sports arenas in this architectural style. Two other examples are the Hala Olivia in Gdańsk, Poland, and the now destroyed Volgar Sports Palace in Tolyatti, Russia.

Controversy
The venue is located on the site of the Piramónt cemetery, the oldest Jewish cemetery in Vilnius, which dates back to the late fifteenth century, when Vilnius was the capital of the Grand Duchy of Lithuania. Russian authorities closed the cemetery in 1831. The Soviet authorities destroyed the cemetery in 1949–1950 during the construction of Žalgiris Stadium.

In August 2015, Lithuania's Chief Rabbi Chaim Burshtein was dismissed by the Lithuanian Jews after he made a public statement opposing the conversion of the arena into a convention center. In 2016–2017, a petition opposing the convention center received 38,000 signatures, many from descendants of Lithuanian Jews now living in other countries.

News plans for transforming the Palace of Concerts and Sports into a modern convention center were announced in December 2019. The plans were discussed and approved by the Lithuanian Jewish community and by the London-based Committee for the Preservation of Jewish Cemeteries in Europe. However, more than 50,000 signatures have been collected against the plan and a descendant of people buried in the cemetery sued the owners of the venue at the Vilnius District Court to halt the works. The plaintiff was later joined by more than a hundred others.

References

Indoor arenas in Lithuania
Sports venues in Vilnius
Basketball venues in Lithuania
Volleyball venues in Lithuania